Jonathan Patrick Barden (born 9 November 1992) is an English footballer who plays as a midfielder for Sutton United.

Early career
Born in North London, Barden began his career at the Watford Academy where he played for three seasons. Barden's playing period with the Watford Academy led to an extended tenure with both Tottenham Hotspur and Reading's academies.

Barden also represented England schools at the U18 age group.

College
In 2011, Barden earned a soccer scholarship to play at James Madison University, an NCAA Division 1 program. A four-year starter, Barden made 66 appearances and earned All-Conference and All-State honours.

Professional

IBV
After a stint with Portland Phoenix FC, in 2015 Barden signed with the Icelandic Premier League club Íþróttabandalag Vestmannaeyja. Barden's success with the club led IBV to extend his contract through the 2016 season. During the 2016 season, Barden helped IBV reach the Icelandic Cup final.

Ottawa Fury
In January 2017, Barden joined United Soccer League newcomers Ottawa Fury.

St Louis FC
In December 2017, Barden signed for Saint Louis of the United Soccer League. He was made club captain for the 2018 season.

Sutton United
In June 2019, following a spell at the club on a non-contract basis, Barden signed for Sutton United, who play in the National League.

Honours

Club
Sutton United
 National League: 2020–21

References

External links

1992 births
Living people
English footballers
Association football midfielders
English expatriate footballers
Expatriate soccer players in Canada
Expatriate soccer players in the United States
Expatriate footballers in Iceland
James Madison Dukes men's soccer players
Wealdstone F.C. players
Ottawa Fury (2005–2013) players
GPS Portland Phoenix players
Íþróttabandalag Vestmannaeyja players
Ottawa Fury FC players
Saint Louis FC players
Sutton United F.C. players
USL Championship players
USL League Two players
English expatriate sportspeople in the United States
English expatriate sportspeople in Canada
English Football League players